Reeves Plains is a settlement in South Australia. It is on the Adelaide Plains, halfway from Gawler to Mallala.

The Reeves Plains School opened in 1867 and closed in 1967. The post office is also closed. The Primitive Methodist church was built in 1873 next to the school. It became a Methodist church in 1900 and closed in 1938. When it was demolished in 1948, some of the material was used to extend the Redbanks church hall. There was also a tennis club at Reeves Plains.

Reeves Plains economy is predominantly farming and grazing. There is a proposal in 2017 to build the Reeves Plains Power Station on grazing land where the Moomba-Adelaide gas pipeline and a high voltage powerline cross the locality.

References

Towns in South Australia